The Cock, the Mouse and the Little Red Hen is a  European fable first collected by Félicité Lefèvre and published in illustrated form by Grant Richards in 1907. The story is a variation of the fable, the Little Red Hen and has been further adapted to the modern fable, the Fox and the Little Red Hen.

The plot
On two hills are two houses. One house is well kept where the cock, mouse and red hen live. The other house is ramshackle where the bad fox and little foxes live. The little foxes are hungry so the greedy fox decides to catch the cock, the mouse and the hen for their supper.  At the well kept  house, the cock and the mouse show their nature of laziness by refusing to help with breakfast chores.  The hard working red hen does all the chores cheerfully.  

The mouse and the cock sleep while the fox approaches the house and they carelessly let the fox in. All are captured and popped into a sack and carried off.  The fox tires and lays down to rest.  The red hen effects the escape from the sack by using her sewing utensils and substituting stones for themselves.  After the three run away home, fox awakes, picks up the sack of stones, and falls into the stream, and is never seen again. As a reward, the hen enjoys a break while cock and mouse do all the chores, thankful to be alive.

The moral lesson 
The central moral lesson of the fable is that "hard work pays", in that the laziness of the  cock & mouse lead to the capture of the animals by the fox and the assiduous hen then works hard to get them free again.

The secondary moral lesson is to "be prepared for every eventuality" whereby the red hen kept a sewing kit on her person just in case it was ever needed and this saved their lives.

Background and adaptations

Retelling 
As with such old tales, these were retold orally over time and naturally varied. In recent history, the tale has been re-told through different publications with variations in the storyline appearing: -

 1907; - retold by Félicité Lefèvre, published by E Grant Richards
 1925; - retold by Watty Piper, published by Platt & Munk
 1931; - retold by Peat Fern Bisel, published by Saalfield
 1960; - retold by Helen Adler, published by Rand McNally
 1982; - retold by Lorinda Bryan Cauley, published by Putnam Juvenile
 1992; - retold by Graham Percy, published by Candlewick

The little red hen 
The tale is related to the Little Red Hen, as both stories have a red hen representing an assiduous nature and other animals representing a slothful nature, with a central moral lesson of both stories being that "hard work pays".  Where they differ is in their secondary moral lessons.  The Little Red Hen shows that if you don't help someone, you can’t expect to reap the resulting benefits, whereas the cock, the mouse and the little red hen promotes being prepared for every eventuality as an important maxim of the story. The two fables are likely to have had a common ancestor story which diverged into the two tales sometime in the historical past.

The fox and the little red hen 
The significant modern adaptation of this fable has been its simplification for younger readers with the name simply referring to the fox and the hen. Here the other animals are dropped and the core story focuses on the red hen escaping from the fox because of having the sewing kit on her person.  In these variants, the assiduous nature of the little red hen is not bought out instead the moral is on her being prepared for every eventuality. The simplified tale for children learning to read has been published many times, a list of early publications is shown below: -

 1931; - The Little Red Hen and the Fox - Fairy Tales From the World Over retold by Georgene Faulkner, published by Grosset & Dunlap, New York
 1968; - The Sly Fox and the Little Red Hen retold by Vera Southgate, published by Ladybird Books
 1969; - Lazy Fox and Red Hen (tell-a-tale) retold by Jane Dwyer, published by Whitman
 1999; - The Sly Fox and Little Red Hen retold by Jenny Giles, published by Cengage Learning New Zealand
 1999; - The Sly Fox and Little Red Hen retold by Mandy Ross, published by Penguin Books
 2009; - The Fox and the Little Red Hen retold by Brenda Parkes, published by ThriftBooks, Dallas
The ladybird series, "read it yourself" also has had several re-tellers, including: - Diana Mayo, Fran Hunia and Susan Ullstein

References

External links
  The Cock, The Mouse and the Little Red Hen (HTML version), Retold by Félicité Lefèvre and Illustrated by Tony Sarg, Originally Published by E. Grant Richards in London, 1907, available from Project Gutenberg
 The Little Red Hen: An Old English Folk Tale (HTML version), Retold and Illustrated by Florence White Williams, Saalfield Publishing Company, 1918, available from Project Gutenberg

Fables
Animal tales
Works of unknown authorship
Fictional chickens
American picture books